Wild Angels (Divlji anđeli) is a 1969 Croatian film directed by Fadil Hadžić, starring Božidar Orešković, Mladen Crnobrnja and Igor Galo.

Plot
Inspired by crime movies, three young men decide to rob a store. With the stolen money, they go to a seaside resort to have some fun, but after a while the police tracks them down.

References

External links
 

1969 films
1960s Croatian-language films
Yugoslav crime drama films
Films directed by Fadil Hadžić
Jadran Film films
Croatian crime drama films
1969 crime drama films